Sembawang is a planning area and residential town located in the North Region of Singapore. Sembawang planning area is bordered by Simpang to the east, Mandai to the south, Yishun to the southeast, Woodlands to the west and the Straits of Johor to the north.

Despite the relatively large development in the Sembawang New Town, the area remains largely suburban, with military, industrial and recreational facilities at its periphery. It hosted a major naval base and port facilities since the early 20th century, and continues to handle regular shipping traffic today along its wharves.

Etymology
The earliest reference to Sembawang is found in Franklin and Jackson's 1830 Map of Singapore, which refers to the River Tambuwang. The place is said to have got its name from the pokok sembawang (Malay for the kayae ferruginea), which has been renamed Mesua ferruginea from 1980. This tree can be seen at Sembawang Park.

History
The Sembawang area in the early twentieth century was the site of the Nee Soon Rubber estate. During the colonial times, Sembawang was home to a major British naval base, its construction of which began in 1928 and was completed in 1938. The base included dockyards, wharves and workshops, as well as supporting administrative, residential and commercial areas. The Naval Base has since been handed over to the Singapore government, which in 1968 converted it into a commercial dockyard (as Sembawang Shipyard, now part of Singapore Exchange-listed SembCorp Marine) that went on to become SembCorp, a major state-owned industrial conglomerate.

Military

The completion of Royal Navy's Singapore Naval Base (also known as HMS Sembawang) in 1938 and RAF Sembawang (also known as HMS Simbang) in March 1940 marked the start of military presence in Sembawang. In February 1942, both bases were partially torched and wrecked by the retreating British forces during the Battle of Singapore to deny their use by units of the advancing Imperial Japanese Army. After the end of World War II in 1945, both bases were reverted to British control and would eventually go on to play an important part in Britain's continued military presence in the Far East (along with the three other RAF bases in Singapore: RAF Changi, RAF Seletar and RAF Tengah) during the critical period of Malayan Emergency (1948–1960), the Brunei Revolt in 1962 and during the Indonesia–Malaysia confrontation (1962–1966).

Despite the withdrawal of British forces from Singapore in 1971 and the handover of the Singapore Naval Base to the Singapore Government in 1968, the British Ministry of Defence (MoD) continues to maintain a small logistics base at Sembawang wharf to control most of the foreign military activities there, which includes repair, refuel and resupply for ships of the Australian, British and New Zealand navies as well as those from other Commonwealth countries under the auspices of Five Power Defence Arrangements (FPDA). This special arrangement was also extended to the United States Navy since early 1960s to support the American involvement in the Vietnam War.

As part of a 1990 agreement between Singapore and the United States, American military forces (primarily naval and air force) have been making use of Sembawang's base facilities. The Task Force 73 (and Commander Logistic Group Western Pacific), part of US 7th Fleet, has been headquartered in Sembawang since 1992.

Sembawang Camp
The Sembawang Camp is a Singapore Armed Forces military base on Admiralty Road, open only to military personnel on official business. The camp houses the 1st and 3rd Transport Battalion of the Singapore Army, as well as the Republic of Singapore Navy's Naval Diving Unit (NDU). Also, the compound housing the Naval Diving Unit was previously known as Terror Camp in deference to the old admin and Officers club section of the Royal Naval facility which was called HMS Terror.

Land reclamation
Extensive land reclamation throughout Singapore has left Sembawang with one of the country's last natural beaches, the Wak Hassan Beach located at Sembawang Park. Today, the vegetable farms, rubber plantations and Chinese graveyards surrounding the former naval base have given way to modern housing, especially in the 1990s during the development of a New Town by the Singapore Housing and Development Board. The town remains a major port, with Sembawang Wharves handling a high volume of bulk commodities cargo, such as timber and rubber.

Roads and waterways

Sembawang Road is one of the key roads built to connect the naval base to the city centre in the South. This road began as a track in the 1920s and was officially named Sembawang Road in 1938. Buses operated by various private companies were then the main mode of transport. The thoroughfare was also dotted with many villages along its length: Chye Kay Village, Sungei Simpang Village, Chong Pang Village, Sembawang Village. Most of these villages were cleared during the 1970s1990s to make way for Yishun and Sembawang New Towns. The last of the villages, Kampong Wak Hassan, was cleared in 1998. Present day Sembawang Road is a major arterial road linking the Northern and Central portion of Singapore.

Many other roads in Sembawang are named after various Royal Navy dockyards, warships, admirals, countries and cities. Examples include Wellington, Canberra, Canada, Gibraltar, Kenya and Falkland. These names were given during the previous British administration, and reflect the town's history as a British naval base.

Its middle section was diverted in the 1920s to provide the land needed for the British Naval Base. During the 1970s, the Northern portions of the river was straightened and canalized. The Southern portions of the river, which consisted of mangroves, ponds and grassland, was filled in during the 1990s in preparation for the development of Sembawang New Town.

Modern history
The planning of Sembawang New Town started in 1996 where the Woodlands MRT Extension was opened, and Sembawang MRT station was also opened at the same time. When the station was opened, the area was undeveloped except the Canberra Road and the then-developing Sembawang New Town. This was resolved in 1998 because of the accelerating development of Sembawang New Town, which was completed in 2004. These HDB flats were within Sembawang, Canberra and Gambas division.

In late 2022, Sembawang will have their first hawker centre and polyclinic, this will be at Bukit Canberra which will open progressively from July 2022 onwards.

Main facilities

The new town contains some of the most common communal facilities found in Singapore, such as:
 Sembawang Bus Interchange, strategically located next to Sun Plaza, was completed on 20 November 2005. This replaced the old bus terminals located at the Northern tip of Sembawang Road, just next to Sembawang Park and the other located along Admiralty Road West. 
 Sembawang MRT station
 Canberra MRT station
 Five primary schools, including Sembawang Primary School, Canberra Primary School, Endeavour Primary School, Wellington Primary School, and Northoaks Primary School.
 Two secondary schools, including Sembawang Secondary School and Canberra Secondary School.
 Three shopping centres, including Sembawang Shopping Centre, Canberra Plaza and Sun Plaza next to the Sembawang MRT station.
 Sembawang Public Library, which is managed by the National Library Board and situated within the Sun Plaza shopping centre
 Bukit Canberra, an integrated sport and community hub which its hawker centre officially opened on 17 December 2022.

Notable Places

Sembawang Park
Sembawang Park, a 15 hectare tranquil park developed in the 1970s and maintained by the National Parks Board, is situated at the Northern tip of Sembawang Road. One of the few parks in Singapore with a natural beach, the Wak Hassan Beach, this park is a heaven for city dwellers who are tired of the never-ending concrete buildings and sky-scrapers. It's a popular spot for campers as well as families who wish to spend an idyllic day by the beach. One can dine at the Beaulieu House, built in 1910, which was the residence of Admiral Sir Geoffrey Layton (Commander-in-Chief British Eastern Fleet, 1940–1942). A wide range of fauna and flora awaits visitors, ranging from the spectacular cannonball tree (Couroupita guianensis) to the many species of birds which have made the park their nesting grounds.

Within the park is a Battleship-themed outdoor playground that pays tribute to the area's naval history. The playground is located near to Carpark 1 and provides families with the opportunity for play within the park.

Sembawang Hot Spring Park
Sembawang Hot Spring Park is the only hot spring park found in Singapore. It is located along [Gambas Avenue] near the junction with Sembawang Road. It reopened on 4 January 2020 after upgrading works, and now features a cascading pool and cafe. Main attractions here are dipping your feet in the spring water and cooking eggs in the spring water.

Sembawang Park Connector
The Sembwang Park Connector is part of the Park Connector Network managed by the National Parks Board. As their name imply, these connectors aim to form a continuous loop which would hopefully connect all the major parks is a planning area and residential town located the North Region of Singapore. Sembawang planning area is bordered by Simpang to the east, Mandai to the south, Yishun to the southeast, Woodlands to the west and the Straits of Johor to the north.

Despite the relatively large development in the Sembawang New Town, the area remains largely suburban, with military, industrial and recreational facilities at its periphery. It hosted a major naval base and port facilities since the early 20th century, and continues to handle regular shipping traffic today along its wharves.

Bukit Canberra
Bukit Canberra is an integrated sports and community hub with amenities such as a hawker centre, polyclinic, a senior care centre, a childcare centre, and several parks.

Politics
Sembawang once begun as a constituency named Seletar but later carved out forming a dedicated Sembawang Single Member Constituency beginning in the 1955, then resized to a smaller constituency leaving only the northern areas.

Sembawang has always been held by the People's Action Party since its formation and has been expanded to include subregions of Admiralty and Canberra since it became a Group Representation Constituency. Former President of Singapore Tony Tan Keng Yam was one of the notable Members of Parliament of Sembawang, and was succeeded by former Tanjong Pagar GRC Member of Parliament and former Transport Minister Khaw Boon Wan beginning in the General Election 2006, followed by Health Minister Ong Ye Kung beginning in General Election 2015 who was then joined by Poh Li San beginning in General Election 2020.

Bibliography

References 

 
Places in Singapore
North Region, Singapore